Zdzisław Celiński (1847 – 1929) was a Polish engineer.

He was a constructor of the railway Buenos Aires - Santa Fe and of the Port Gualeguaychu. Also, he explored Mato Grosso and Gran Chaco.

Polish engineers
1847 births
1929 deaths
Polish civil engineers